Genyange is a ward in Tarime District, Mara Region of northern Tanzania, East Africa. In 2016 the Tanzania National Bureau of Statistics report there were 8,224 people in the ward, from 7,453 in 2012.

Villages / neighborhoods 
The ward has 3 villages and 12 hamlets.

 Ganyange
 Gantende
 Meserere
 Ntagacha
 Nyambili
 Nyamosense
 Borega "A"
 Borega Mjini
 Komagori
 Manyumba
 Mesocho
 Nyakalima
 Kegonche
 Kengabi
 Nyasangai

References

Tarime District
Mara Region